This is a list of all personnel changes for the 1949 NBA off-season and 1949–50 NBA season.

Events

July 16, 1949
 The Denver Nuggets signed Bob Brown as a free agent.
 The Denver Nuggets signed Kenny Sailors as a free agent.

July 26, 1949
 The Indianapolis Olympians sold Leo Mogus to the Philadelphia Warriors.

August 1949
 The Boston Celtics selected Chick Halbert from the Providence Steam Rollers in the dispersal draft.
 The Boston Celtics selected Les Pugh from the Providence Steam Rollers in the dispersal draft.
 The Boston Celtics selected Howie Shannon from the Providence Steam Rollers in the dispersal draft.
 The Boston Celtics selected Brady Walker from the Providence Steam Rollers in the dispersal draft.
 The Boston Celtics selected Ernie Calverley from the Providence Steam Rollers in the dispersal draft. Boston agreed to play 10 home games in Providence.

August 3, 1949
 The Tri-Cities Blackhawks hired Roger Potter as head coach.
 The Syracuse Nationals hired Al Cervi as head coach.
 The Sheboygan Red Skins hired Ken Suesens as head coach.
 The Waterloo Hawks hired Charley Shipp as head coach.

August 13, 1949
 The Indianapolis Olympians sold John Mandic to the Washington Capitols.

September 3, 1949
 The Syracuse Nationals signed Andrew Levane as a free agent.

September 28, 1949
 The Washington Capitols traded Sonny Hertzberg to the Boston Celtics for Chick Halbert.
 The Baltimore Bullets sold Chick Reiser to the Washington Capitols.

October 4, 1949
 The Washington Capitols traded Kleggie Hermsen to the Chicago Stags for Chuck Gilmur.

October 11, 1949
 The Indianapolis Olympians signed Bruce Hale as a free agent.

October 18, 1949
 The Boston Celtics waived Les Pugh.

November ?, 1949
 The Baltimore Bullets signed Les Pugh as a free agent.
 The Denver Nuggets signed Dillard Crocker as a free agent.

November 2, 1949
 The Fort Wayne Pistons sold Jack Smiley to the Anderson Packers.
 The Fort Wayne Pistons waived Dillard Crocker.

November 9, 1949
 The Tri-Cities Blackhawks traded Jack Kerris to the Fort Wayne Pistons for John Mahnken.

November 23, 1949
 The Rochester Royals sold Mike Novak to the Philadelphia Warriors.

November 28, 1949
 The St. Louis Bombers traded Mike Todorovich to the Tri-Cities Blackhawks for Mac Otten and cash.

December ?, 1949
 The Denver Nuggets released Ed Bartels.

December 3, 1949
 The Fort Wayne Pistons sold Dick Triptow to the Baltimore Bullets.

December 5, 1949
 The Waterloo Hawks signed Hoot Gibson as a free agent.

December 6, 1949
 The New York Knicks signed Ed Bartels as a free agent.
 The Washington Capitols sold Dick Schulz to the Tri-Cities Blackhawks.

December 7, 1949
 The Philadelphia Warriors traded Ed Sadowski and cash to the Baltimore Bullets for Ron Livingstone.
 The Tri-Cities Blackhawks sold Billy Hassett to the Minneapolis Lakers.

December 8, 1949
 The New York Knicks sold Lee Knorek to the Baltimore Bullets.

December 12, 1949
 The Chicago Stags sold Ed Mikan to the Rochester Royals.

December 13, 1949
 The Baltimore Bullets released Dick Triptow.

December 15, 1949
 The Indianapolis Olympians sold Floyd Volker to the Denver Nuggets.
 The Boston Celtics sold George Nostrand to the Tri-Cities Blackhawks.

December 20, 1949
 The Tri-Cities Blackhawks traded George Nostrand to the Chicago Stags for Gene Vance.

December 21, 1949
 The Minneapolis Lakers sold Paul Walther to the Indianapolis Olympians.

December 29, 1949
 The Philadelphia Warriors signed Freddie Lewis as a free agent.

December 30, 1949
 The Anderson Packers traded Walt Kirk to the Tri-Cities Blackhawks for Red Owens.

?
 The Tri-Cities Blackhawks sold Bob Cousy to the Chicago Stags.

January 5, 1950
 The Washington Capitols released John Mandic.
 The Baltimore Bullets signed John Mandic as a free agent.

January 12, 1950
 The Waterloo Hawks released Stan Patrick.

January 13, 1950
 The Tri-Cities Blackhawks sold Whitey Von Nieda to the Baltimore Bullets.

January 18, 1950
 The Anderson Packers traded Ralph Johnson and Howie Schultz to the Fort Wayne Pistons for Charlie Black and Richie Niemiera.

January 29, 1950
 The Tri-Cities Blackhawks traded John Mahnken to the Boston Celtics for Gene Englund.
 The Boston Celtics waived Dermie O'Connell.

February 1, 1950
 The Boston Celtics sold Dermie O'Connell to the St. Louis Bombers.

February 5, 1950
 The Sheboygan Red Skins signed Stan Patrick as a free agent.

February 6, 1950
 The Denver Nuggets sold Duane Klueh to the Fort Wayne Pistons.

February 7, 1950
 The Fort Wayne Pistons sold Bill Henry to the Tri-Cities Blackhawks.

February 9, 1950
 The Waterloo Hawks signed Johnny Orr as a free agent.

February 10, 1950
 The Tri-Cities Blackhawks traded Don Otten to the Washington Capitols for Jack Nichols.

March 10, 1950
 The Washington Capitols hired Bones McKinney as head coach.

March 22, 1950
 Alvin Julian resigns as head coach for Boston Celtics.

April 16, 1950
 The Sheboygan Red Skins sold Noble Jorgensen to the Tri-Cities Blackhawks.

April 25, 1950
 The Chicago Stags selected Frankie Brian from the Anderson Packers in the dispersal draft.
 The Philadelphia Warriors selected Bill Closs from the Anderson Packers in the dispersal draft.
 The Philadelphia Warriors selected Milo Komenich from the Anderson Packers in the dispersal draft.
 The Philadelphia Warriors selected Frank Gates from the Anderson Packers in the dispersal draft.
 The Philadelphia Warriors selected Easy Parham from the St. Louis Bombers in the dispersal draft.
 The Syracuse Nationals selected Belus Smawley from the St. Louis Bombers in the dispersal draft.
 The Rochester Royals selected Charlie Black from the Anderson Packers in the dispersal draft.
 The Minneapolis Lakers selected Mac Otten from the St. Louis Bombers in the dispersal draft.
 The Fort Wayne Pistons selected John Hargis from the Anderson Packers in the dispersal draft.
 The Baltimore Bullets selected Red Rocha from the St. Louis Bombers in the dispersal draft.
 The Baltimore Bullets selected Bill Roberts from the St. Louis Bombers in the dispersal draft.
 The Baltimore Bullets selected Red Owens from the Anderson Packers in the dispersal draft.
 The Boston Celtics selected Ed Macauley from the St. Louis Bombers in the dispersal draft.
 The Boston Celtics selected Ed Stanczak from the Anderson Packers in the dispersal draft.
 The Washington Capitols selected Ariel Maughan from the St. Louis Bombers in the dispersal draft.
 The Washington Capitols selected Don Putman from the St. Louis Bombers in the dispersal draft.
 The Tri-Cities Blackhawks selected John Logan from the St. Louis Bombers in the dispersal draft.
 The Tri-Cities Blackhawks selected Richie Niemiera from the Anderson Packers in the dispersal draft.

April 27, 1950
 Red Auerbach resigns as head coach for Tri-Cities Blackhawks.
 The Boston Celtics hired Red Auerbach as head coach.

May 21, 1950
The Chicago Stags sold Frankie Brian to the Tri-Cities Blackhawks.

June 19, 1950
The Baltimore Bullets selected Harry Boykoff from the Waterloo Hawks in the dispersal draft.
 The Baltimore Bullets select Dick Mehen from the Waterloo Hawks in the dispersal draft.

June 21, 1950
 The Boston Celtics sold George Kaftan to the New York Knicks.

June 22, 1950
 The Denver Nuggets sold Kenny Sailors to the Boston Celtics.

June 27, 1950
 The Rochester Royals sold Andy Duncan to the Boston Celtics.

Notes
 Number of years played in the NBA prior to the draft
 Career with the franchise that drafted the player
 Never played a game for the franchise

External links
NBA Transactions at NBA.com
1949-50 NBA Transactions| Basketball-Reference.com

References

Transactions
1949-50